The Minamiaiki Dam is a rock-fill embankment dam on the Minamiaiki River in Minamiaiki, Nagano Prefecture, Japan. Together with the Ueno Dam, it provides water for the Kannagawa Hydropower Plant owned by the Tokyo Electric Power Company. The Minamiaiki dam is the higher of the two dams. When completed, the station will have the largest power output of any pump-storage power plant in the world at around 2.82 GW. Since 2005 Unit 1 with installed capacity of 470 MW is in commercial operation. Commercial operation of Unit 2 is planned in 2012, commercial operation of all six units as late as 2020.

References

Dams in Nagano Prefecture
Rock-filled dams
Dams completed in 2005